The Maine Black Bears represented University of Maine in the WHEA during the 2014–15 NCAA Division I women's ice hockey season.

Offseason
Katy Massey and Brianne Kilgour were named to the WHEA all-scholastic team.

Recruiting

Roster

2014-15 Black Bears

Schedule

|-
!colspan=12 style=" "| Regular Season

|-
!colspan=12 style=" "| WHEA Tournament

Awards and honors

Goalie Meghann Treacy named to WHEA First Team All-Stars

References

Maine
Maine Black Bears women's ice hockey seasons
2014 in sports in Maine
2015 in sports in Maine